Emma Beach Thayer (1849-1924) was an American artist known for her floral paintings.

Biography
Thayer née Beach was born in New York City in 1849. The Smithsonian American Art Museum credits her with creating studies for the illustrations for Concealing Coloration in the Animal Kingdom. Her 1904 study of The Cotton-Tail Rabbit among Dry Grasses and Leaves is in the collection of the Brooklyn Museum.

Thayer was the daughter of Moses S. Beach and Chloe Buckingham. She was the second wife of the painter Abbott Handerson Thayer (1849–1921) and the step mother of the painter Gerald Handerson Thayer (1883-1939).

Thayer died in Peekskill, New York in 1924.

Gallery

References

External links

images of Emma Beach Thayer's work on ArtNet

1849 births
1924 deaths 
People from New York (state) 
20th-century American women artists